Jesús Fernández Oceja (born 25 February 1974) is a Spanish handball player who competed in the 1996 Summer Olympics.

He was born in Santander.

In 1996 he was a member of the Spanish handball team which won the bronze medal. He played two matches.

External links
profile

1974 births
Living people
Handball players from Cantabria
Spanish male handball players
Olympic handball players of Spain
Handball players at the 1996 Summer Olympics
Olympic bronze medalists for Spain
Olympic medalists in handball
Medalists at the 1996 Summer Olympics
Sportspeople from Santander, Spain